Kristine Kunce (née Radford; born 3 March 1970) is a former professional tennis player from Australia who competed during the mid-1980s through the 1990s.

Kunce reached a career-high ranking of world No. 45 on 15 August 1994, and a career high in doubles of 25 on 19 September 1994. She won six doubles titles on the WTA Tour during her career.

Her best performance at a Grand Slam was at the 1994 Wimbledon Championships, where she was knocked out in the fourth round by eventual champion Conchita Martínez.

WTA finals

Doubles: 13 (6 titles, 7 runner-ups)

ITF finals

Singles (6–6)

Doubles (15–16)

References

External links
 
 
 

1970 births
Australian female tennis players
Hopman Cup competitors
Living people
Tennis players from Sydney
21st-century Australian women